Aleksandra Nikolić (born 1990) is a Serbian fashion model and local celebrity. She is known for appearing in a Pitbull music video and being  profiled in a 2017 issue of GQ magazine  

Nikolić started out modeling in Serbia in 2010, appearing in TV commercials and a music video for local pop singer Arindy. She also modeled for various Serbian fashion magazines like "Harpers Bazaar", "Grazia", "Joy Serbia", and "Svet & Style". Additionally, she appeared on the cover of Spanish "Harpers Bazaar" and in the French magazines "Femme" and "Noon". She was also photographed in a spread for "The New Yorker" in 2014. She has been seen in ad campaigns for "Jacobs by Marc Jacobs" and Swedish brand "Chiquelle". In 2016, she did a runway show in Miami for the Serbian label "Hamel", designed by Melina Džinović. Nikolić also modeled in Japan for six months.

Nikolić was born and raised in Belgrade, Serbia. She has lived in Miami since 2013, where she is represented by Elite Models.She now works for a company in Germany which produces gardening tools.

References

External links
 http://demons-books.netwalkapp.com/model/8/aleksandra-nikolic
 https://web.archive.org/web/20180521072458/http://www.elitemodel.com/miami/women/alexandra-nikolic/portfolio/#slideid_42_201172_297152

Living people
1990 births
Serbian female models
Models from Belgrade